Like a Man is a 2022 Russian thriller drama film directed by Maksim Kulagin. It stars Anton Lapenko. It was theatrically released on November 10, 2022 by Central Partnership.

Plot 
The film tells about a 35-year-old man named Gleb, who has everything he needs to be happy: a beautiful wife, a successful business and a luxurious country house. But as a result of a showdown with a drunken neighbor who hit his wife, his life changes dramatically.

Cast 
 Anton Lapenko as Gleb
 Ekaterina Shcherbakova as Polina
 Evgeniya Sinitskaya as Rita
 Vladimir Gorislavets as Kostya
 Anastasiya Chuyeva as Vera
 Polina Sinilnikova as Tanya
 Olga Khokhlova
 Sergey Vasin as Artur
 Anton Artemyev
 Konstantin Umrikhin as basketball player

References 

2022 films
2022 thriller drama films
2020s Russian-language films
Russian thriller drama films
2022 drama films